This is a list of episodes of the television series Hazel.

Series overview
At present, all five seasons have been released on DVD.

Episodes

Season 1 (1961–62)
This is the only season in black-and-white, with the exception of episode 6 which was filmed in color.

Season 2 (1962–63)
This is the first color season; all following seasons are also in color.

Season 3 (1963–64)

Season 4 (1964–65)

Season 5 (1965–66)
For the final season, the show was moved from NBC to CBS, and changes were made to the main cast of characters.

References

External links
 
 

Hazel